The Church of St Lambert, Burneston, is the Anglican parish church for the village of Burneston in North Yorkshire, England. The church was built progressively in the 14th, 15th and 16th centuries, with some later additions and is now a grade I listed structure. It is the only Anglican church in England to be dedicated to St Lambert, and one of its former vicars, Canon John Hartley, was noted for being a winner at the Men's Singles championship at Wimbledon two years running.

The church was grade I listed in 1966.

History
Whilst the current structure dates back to the 13th century, it is known that church existed at Burneston not long after the Domesday Book was collated, as Robert de Musters gave the church at Burneston to St Mary's Abbey in York during the tenure of William Rufus, who reigned between 1087 and 1100. The chancel was built in the 14th century, and the tower was added between 1400 and 1410. Each corner of the tower is supported by a buttress which had a shield bearing the coat of arms of some of the local noble families. Whilst many of the features of the church are finished in a Perpendicular style, the sedilla and chancel arch are in the Decorated style.

The church was renovated in 1854 by the Duchess of Cleveland, being described as "quite a model for a country parish." Almost the entire east end of the church is a window dedicated to the Duke of Cleveland, installed at the request of the duchess during the renovations. Glynne, who visited the church in 1871, described the church as "...wholly Perpendicular, very uniform, also in very good condition, though some of the improvements have been done too soon." Likewise, Pevsner described the church as being Perpendicular, and suggested the early fifteenth century for the date of the church.

St Lambert's is reputed to be the only Anglican church in Great Britain dedicated solely to Saint Lambert, a 7th century archbishop in Maastricht. Historically, there was a fountain or well in the churchyard which has since been covered over or culverted. The well, known as Halig-Keld, is thought to have possibly given rise to the name of the local wapentake - Hallikeld.

Listed structures
Besides the main structure of the church, which is grade I listed, there are three other listed structures in the churchyard;

The two gateways and wall surrounding the church on the western and northern sides. They were built  and are grade II listed
The war memorial, grade II listed
The tombstone of Francis Rund

Parish and benefice
The church is part of the Benefice of Benefice of Kirklington with Burneston, Wath and Pickhill. St Lambert's is the largest church in the benefice with the ability to seat 300 people. The church has recorded an average weekly attendance of 60 people in 2011, which had dropped to 35 by 2019.

Clergy
John Wilson, previously the headmaster of Westminster School, was the incumbent between 1622 and 1634. Wilson had also been the incumbent at nearby St Gregory's Church in Bedale.

Between 1874 and 1919, the incumbent at St Lambert's was the Canon John Hartley, who won the Wimbledon men's singles tournament in 1879 and 1880. His opponent in the 1879 match, Vere St. Leger Goold, was later convicted of murder. The vicar won the semi-final on the Friday, went back to Burneston to conduct the Sunday services, tended to an ill parishioner on the Monday, and then went back to London on the Tuesday. He changed into his tennis whites on the slow train between Waterloo and Wimbledon. John Hartley is buried in the churchyard underneath the east window.

Notes

References

Sources

External links

Benefice website
Church faculty record

Grade I listed churches in North Yorkshire
Church of England church buildings in North Yorkshire